Struve 1694 (Σ 1694, Struve 1694) is a double star in the constellation Camelopardalis.

Σ 1694 is a double star, with components of magnitudes 5.3m and 5.9m:
Σ 1694A (HD 112028) is a white A-type giant star with an apparent magnitude of 5.28m.   It is approximately 300 light years from Earth.  
Σ 1694B (HD 112014) is a spectroscopic binary consisting of two A-type main sequence stars.

Norton's Star Atlas describes the pair as yellowish and bluish.

Σ 1694 was also known as 32H. Camelopardalis, Hevelius' 32nd of Camelopardalis.  It is not Flamsteed's "32 Camelopardalis", which is ξ Aurigae. In the British Association Catalogue, the star pair are listed as being in  Ursa Minor.

Chinese name

This star was regarded as the north star by the Chinese people from Han Dynasty to Song Dynasty.

References

112028
Struve 1694